Canoe.com is an English-language Canadian portal site and website network, and is a subsidiary of Postmedia Network. The phrase Canadian Online Explorer appears in the header; the name is also evidently a play on words on canoe (or canoë in French).

Canoe's head office is in Toronto at 333 King Street East.

At launch, Canoe was a joint venture between Sun Media (Toronto Sun Publishing Corp.) and Rogers Communications (Rogers Multi-Media Inc.) though Rogers sold its shares of Canoe to BCE Inc. within its first year.

At the height of its popularity, Canoe had both English and French language version and owned a significant number of websites, including JAM! and the Sun Media newspaper sites.

References 

Companies based in Toronto
Canadian news websites
Multilingual websites
Quebecor
Quebec websites
Internet properties established in 1996
1996 establishments in Canada